Wendler may refer to:

Wendler Arena, an ice rink which is part of the Dow Event Center in Saginaw, Michigan
Wendler Middle School, in the Anchorage School District, Alaska
Wendler (Karosseriebau, established 1840), car body manufacturers in Reutlingen, Germany

People 
 (1734–1794), mayor of Leipzig
Andy Wendler, founding member of the punk band Necros
Anne-Kathrin "Anni" Wendler (born 1985), contestant on Germany's Next Topmodel, Cycle 2
 (born 1989), German ice hockey goalie
Edwin Wendler (born 1975), Austrian composer
Frank Wendler, German motorcycle racer
 (1913–2007), German glass artist
Friedrich Moritz Wendler (1814–1872), German painter
 (1905–1989), German steam locomotive engineer
Hansi Wendler (1912–2010), German actress
Herbert Wendler (1912–1998), German confectionery manufacturer
Jack Wendler, art gallery owner
Joachim Wendler (1939–1975), West German aquanaut
 (1893–1980), German graphic artist, painter and photographer
Michael Wendler (born 1972), German singer
 (1895–1958), German educator and writer
Paul H. Wendler (1917–2013), politician from Michigan
Philipp Wendler (born 1991), Austrian footballer
Richard Wendler (1898–1972), Nazi politician
Walter Wendler, former chancellor of Southern Illinois University

See also
 Windler, a surname

Surnames from nicknames